Stephanie Corneliussen (born April 28, 1987) is a Danish actress and model, best known for her role as Joanna Wellick in Mr. Robot.

Early life
Corneliussen was born in Copenhagen. She attended Johannesskolen in Frederiksberg and studied ballet in Copenhagen. She has a degree in graphic design.

She was discovered at age 13 and encouraged to enter the Supermodel of Scandinavia contest, which was orchestrated by Jacqueline Friis Mikkelsen, the CEO of Unique Models, an international modeling agency based in Copenhagen. She won the contest and subsequently began her international modeling career. While still expanding her modeling career, she began studying in the United Kingdom in 2007, and in 2011 she relocated to Los Angeles.

Career
Corneliussen has been on the cover of and featured in many magazines, including GQ, Vanity Fair, treats!, Vs., Playboy, and Vogue. She has also appeared in several ad campaigns and commercials for brands like bebe, Armani, Dasani, Lexus and Nikon. , Corneliussen is represented by PCM International.

She has had guest appearances on the USA Network medical drama series Royal Pains, the NBC sitcom Bad Judge and the TV Land sitcom The Exes. On July 30, 2012, Corneliussen appeared in Matchbox Twenty's official video for "She's So Mean" as the mayhem wielding girl.

For the American anthology horror television series American Horror Story, Corneliussen portrayed the "White Nun", the face representing the second season, subtitled Asylum. In 2013, she appeared in the film Hansel and Gretel: Witch Hunters, and the following year she portrayed Tatiana in HBO's Emmy Award nominated TV film Hello Ladies.

In 2015, Corneliussen was cast in a recurring role in the USA Network drama–thriller television series Mr. Robot, playing the character of Joanna Wellick. The pilot premiered on May 27, 2015. The show has received critical acclaim and has been nominated for multiple awards, winning the 2015 Golden Globe Award for Best Television Series – Drama. Mr. Robot was picked up for a second season. In September 2015, it was announced that Corneliussen had been cast as Valentina Vostok in the CW series DC's Legends of Tomorrow, a spin-off of Arrow and The Flash.

In March 2016, Corneliussen was promoted to series regular and added to the main cast of Mr. Robot. In 2018, she was cast as the mysterious antagonist in the television series Deception. In 2019, she appeared as Gabrielle Haller in Noah Hawley's Legion.

Personal life
Corneliussen is bisexual. She is an animal-rights advocate and has been a vegan since 2013.

Filmography

Film

Television

Music Videos

References

External links
 
 
 
 

1987 births
21st-century Danish actresses
Actresses from Copenhagen
Danish child actresses
Danish female models
Danish film actresses
Danish television actresses
Danish bisexual people
Danish LGBT actors
Bisexual actresses
Bisexual models
Living people
American people of Danish descent